CSC Champa Football Club (Laosຊີເອັສຊີ ຈຳປາ) is a professional football club, based in Pakse, Laos, that plays in the Lao Premier League, the highest division in Laotian football. The club plays its home matches at the Champasak Stadium, which holds 12,000 people.

Sponsors

Players

External links 

Football clubs in Laos
Association football clubs established in 2016
2016 establishments in Laos